Pier 24 Photography is a non-profit art museum located on the Port of San Francisco directly under the San Francisco–Oakland Bay Bridge. The organization houses the permanent collection of the Pilara Foundation, which collects, preserves and exhibits photography. It produces exhibitions, publications, and public programs. Pier 24 Photography is the largest exhibition space in the world dedicated solely to photography.

Collection 
Revelations—the Diane Arbus retrospective organized by San Francisco Museum of Modern Art in 2003—inspired the purchase of the Pilara Foundation’s first photograph, a portrait from her "Untitled" series. The collection has grown to over 4,000 works spanning the history of the medium and its international breadth. At the collection’s core are those photographers first exhibited in two seminal twentieth century exhibitions: New Documents (1967) at the Museum of Modern Art and New Topographics (1975) at George Eastman Museum. In recent years, the Foundation has collected more emerging photographers in depth, developing holdings that reflect evolving practices within the medium.

Exhibitions 

Pier 24: The Inaugural Exhibition, March 16, 2010 – June 16, 2010
From the Collection of Randi and Bob Fisher, September 16, 2010 – February 28, 2011
Here., May 23, 2011 – January 31, 2012
About Face, May 15, 2012 – April 30, 2013
A Sense of Place, July 1, 2013 – May 30, 2014
Secondhand, August 1, 2014 – May 31, 2015
The Whiteness of the Whale, August 3, 2015 – February 29, 2016
Collected, May 2, 2016 – January 31, 2017
The Grain of the Present, April 1, 2017 – March 31, 2018
This Land, June 1, 2018 - March 31, 2019
Looking Back: Ten Years of Pier 24 Photography, July 1, 2019 - April 30, 2020

Larry Sultan Visiting Artist Program 
The Larry Sultan Visiting Artist Program is a collaboration between Pier 24 Photography, California College of the Arts and the San Francisco Museum of Modern Art created in honor of the influential Bay Area photographer and educator, Larry Sultan. Each year, the program brings six international artists to San Francisco. During their visits, artists provide a free lecture open to the public. They also work with graduate students at California College of the Arts, mentoring them in the studio and taking them on citywide fieldtrips.

Visiting artists

Larry Sultan Photography Award 
In 2016, Pier 24 Photography in partnership with California College of the Arts, Headlands Center for the Arts, and San Francisco Museum of Modern Art launched the Larry Sultan Photography Award. The award includes a six- to ten-week residency at the Headlands Center for the Arts in Sausalito, California, and a $10,000 cash award.

Recipients
2016: Marco Breuer
2017: Awoiska van der Molen
2018: Bieke Depoorter
2019: Jonathan Calm

Publications
Here., San Francisco: Pier 24 Photography, 2011. . Exhibition guide.
About Face, San Francisco: Pier 24 Photography, 2012.  . Exhibition guide.
A Sense of Place, San Francisco: Pier 24 Photography, 2013. . Exhibition guide.
About Face. San Francisco: Pier 24 Photography, 2014. . Exhibition catalog. Edition of 1000 copies. With forewords by Christopher McCall, and Richard Avedon (from In The American West), an introduction by Philip Gefter, and texts by Sandra S. Phillips, and Ulrike Schneider.
Secondhand, San Francisco: Pier 24 Photography, 2014. . Exhibition guide.
A Sense of Place, San Francisco: Pier 24 Photography, 2015. . Exhibition catalog. Edition of 1000 copies.
Conversations: Secondhand, San Francisco: Pier 24 Photography, 2015. .
Paul Graham: The Whiteness of the Whale, London: Mack; San Francisco, Pier 24 Photography, 2015. .
Day for Night Photographs by Richard Learoyd, New York: Aperture; San Francisco, Pier 24 Photography, 2015. .
Rochester 585/716: A Postcard from America Project, New York: Aperture; San Francisco, Pier 24 Photography, 2015. . Edition of 1000 copies.
Collected, San Francisco: Pier 24 Photography, 2016. . Exhibition guide.
Secondhand, San Francisco: Pier 24 Photography, 2016. . Exhibition catalog. Edition of 1000 copies.
Collected, San Francisco, Pier 24 Photography, 2016.  Exhibition Catalog. Edition of 1000 copies.
The Grain of the Present, San Francisco: Pier 24 Photography, 2017. . Exhibition guide.
John Chiara: California, New York: Aperture; San Francisco, Pier 24 Photography, 2017. 
The Grain of the Present, San Francisco: Pier 24 Photography, 2017. . Exhibition Catalog. Edition of 1000 copies.
This Land, San Francisco: Pier 24 Photography, 2018. ISBN Exhibition Catalog. . Edition of 750 copies.

The building 

Located just south of the Ferry Building on the Port of  San Francisco, Pier 24 Photography is housed in the Pier 24 annex. Originally designed to connect Piers 24 and Pier 26, the Pier 24 annex was originally built to be a 28,000 square foot cargo shed for truck side loading. Pier 24 was constructed between 1912 and 1916, and the annex followed in 1935-36. Several businesses were housed in Pier 24 annex over the twentieth century, including Nelson Steamship Company, American-Hawaiian Steamship Company and Williams, Diamond & Company. The principal cargo stored by these companies included sugar, copra, vanilla, whale oil, and hides. Pier 24 was demolished after its transit shed and bulkhead caught fire in 1997. While the last remnants of Pier 24’s substructure were fully demolished in 2004, the Pier 24 annex remained intact.

The building is rented from the Port of San Francisco, which until 2017 granted the museum rent credits in exchange for repairs and improvements; these expired with the end of the lease term in 2017, and since the museum refused to pay the increased rent, in December 2019 the port served the foundation with notice that it must vacate the building and may be sued for underpayment of rent during the two years since the lease expired.

References

External links 
 

Art museums and galleries in San Francisco
Arts organizations based in the San Francisco Bay Area
Landmarks in San Francisco
Photography museums and galleries in the United States
Tourist attractions in San Francisco
San Francisco Bay